Moses Rodgers House is a private home in Stockton, California. Built in 1898, it was added to the National Register of Historic Places in 1978.

History 

Moses Rodgers was an African American mining engineer who became well-known during the California Gold Rush for his success with the gold mines he owned and operated in Mariposa County. He moved his family to Stockton about 1890 to take advantage of education opportunities for his five daughters.

The historical marker on the Moses Rodgers House is inscribed

References

		
National Register of Historic Places in San Joaquin County, California
Houses completed in 1898